The Folk Lore of John Lee Hooker is an album by blues musician John Lee Hooker recorded in New York and Chicago, with two tracks recorded live at the Newport Folk Festival in 1960, and released by the Vee-Jay label in August or September 1961.

Reception

The Penguin Guide to Blues Recordings wrote that "Vee-Jay were reaching for Hooker's perceived new audience among folkniks, yet only 'Tupelo' and 'The Hobo' from his set with acoustic guitar at the 1960 Newport Folk Festival, represent the 'folk blues' angle Hooker had begun to develop a year earlier; the rest is typical of his Vee-Jay work, especially the four tracks with a band."

AllMusic reviewer Al Campbell stated: "The Folk Lore of John Lee Hooker was released in 1961, combining 12 tracks of both acoustic and electric tunes... recommended."

Track listing
All compositions credited to John Lee Hooker
 "Tupelo" – 3:22
 "I'm Mad Again" – 2:39
 "I'm Going Upstairs" – 2:56
 "Want Ad Blues" – 2:16
 "Five Long Years" – 3:38
 "I Like to See You Walk" – 2:52
 "The Hobo" – 3:01
 "Hard-Headed Woman" – 2:31
 "Wednesday Evening Blues" – 3:59
 "Take Me As I Am" – 3:02
 "My First Wife Left Me" – 3:35
 "You're Looking Good Tonight" – 3:00
Recorded in New York City on April 29, 1960 (tracks 5, 6 & 9-12), at the Newport Folk Festival on June 25, 1960 (tracks 1 & 7) and at Universal Recording Studio in Chicago on January 4, 1961 (tracks 2-4 & 8)

Personnel
John Lee Hooker – guitar, vocals
William "Lefty" Bates – harmonica, guitar (tracks 2-4 & 8) 
Bill Lee (tracks 1 & 7), Quinn Wilson (tracks 2-4 & 8) – bass 
Earl Phillips – drums (tracks 2-4 & 8) 
?Pops Staples – guitar (tracks 2-4 & 8)

References

John Lee Hooker albums
1961 albums
Vee-Jay Records albums